{{DISPLAYTITLE:C8H18N2O4S}}
The molecular formula C8H18N2O4S (molar mass: 238.30 g/mol, exact mass: 238.0987 u) may refer to:

 Burgess reagent
 HEPES

Molecular formulas